The Treaty with Algiers was signed on June 30, 1815, between the United States of America and the "Barbary State" of Algeria. As the treaty provided in Article One:

There shall be from the Conclusion of this treaty, a firm inviolable and universal peace and friendship between the President and Citizens of the United States of America on the one part, and the Dey and Subjects of the Regency of Algiers in Barbary, on the other, made by the free consent of both parties and upon the terms of the most favored nations; and if either party shall hereafter grant to any other nation, any particular favor or privilege in navigation or Commerce it shall immediately become common to the other party, freely when freely it is granted to such other nation; but when the grant is conditional, it shall be at the option of the contracting parties to accept, alter, or reject such conditions, in such manner as shall be most conducive to their respective interests. 

It was ratified by the United States Congress on December 26, 1815.

See also
List of treaties

External links
Text of the Treaty

Barbary Wars
Tunis
Tunis
Algeria–United States relations
1815 treaties
Treaties of Algeria
Ottoman Algeria
June 1815 events